Donald S. Reinhardt (1908–1989) was an American trombonist and brass teacher.

He authored several books for brass players, including the Pivot System for Trumpet and Trombone: A Complete Manual With Studies and the Encyclopedia of the Pivot System.

Life and career 

Donald Shelley Reinhardt was born in Allentown, Pennsylvania, on January 22, 1908. Reinhardt began his formal musical studies as a violinist but eventually moved to studying the trombone. In spite of some initial success, he struggled and sought help from eighteen different instructors, none of whom were able to help him work through his technical limitations. After an accident damaged his trombone he sent it to be repaired; however it was returned to him with the counterweight still removed. When he went to play the instrument with the counterweight still off, he ended up with a lower horn angle than he had previously played and he noticed that his range had dramatically improved. Some experimentation led him to discover that in order to perform well he needed to play in some ways that were quite different from how most other fine brass musicians played. This led to an interest in studying the physical mechanics of brass technique.

Reinhardt studied music at the Curtis Institute of Music, graduating in 1943 and earned a doctorate from Combs College of Music in 1960.

In the 1930s Reinhardt performed as a trombonist in Philadelphia for the Fox Theater, Philadelphia Grand Opera, and Philadelphia Civic Opera. In 1939 the Fox Theater fired the orchestra. Reinhardt took this opportunity to travel with his wife for the next five months. During this trip, he met in Kansas a young trombone student, whom he gave a brief lesson to, sparking his interest in becoming a teacher. For the next two years, Reinhardt gave free instructions to brass students in order to test and develop his teaching ideas.

In 1954 Reinhardt established a teaching studio in Philadelphia. In 1956 he was appointed Director of Bands at La Salle College High School in Philadelphia, a position he held until 1973.

By the mid-1980s years Reinhardt developed serious health problems. He died of cancer on May 26, 1989.

Teaching 

Reinhardt termed his approach to teaching the Pivot System, a term he borrowed from golf. He originally defined a pivot as transferring pressure from one lip to another while changing registers on a brass instrument. He later changed this definition to mean the pushing and pulling of a player's mouthpiece and lips together, as a single unit, up or down along the teeth while changing registers.
According to Reinhardt, the three primary playing factors of brass technique were correct breathing, tonguing, and embouchure. Reinhardt felt that each player's unique anatomical features required each player to perform differently and based his teaching on establishing the correct method for each individual student. He noted and categorized eight different tonguing types and four basic embouchure types with five subtypes. Each student would receive a personalized routine that took into account the student's embouchure and tonguing types.

References

External links 
 The Reinhardt Foundation
 An Introduction to Donald S. Reinhardt's Pivot System

1908 births
1989 deaths
American trombonists